The 1955 Wyoming Cowboys football team was an American football team that represented the University of Wyoming as a member of the Skyline Conference during the 1955 college football season. In their third year under head coach Phil Dickens, the Cowboys compiled a record of eight wins and three losses (8–3, 5–2 Skyline), defeated Texas Tech in the 1956 Sun Bowl, and outscored opponents by a total of 225 to 137.  They played their home games at War Memorial Stadium in Laramie, Wyoming.

Schedule

1955 team players in the NFL
The following were selected in the 1956 NFL Draft.

References

Wyoming Cowboys
Wyoming Cowboys football seasons
Sun Bowl champion seasons
1955 in  sports in Wyoming